The 2003–04 season was the club's 46th season in the Turkish Super League and their 101st year in existence. Beşiktaş finished the Super League 3rd, behind Fenerbahçe and Trabzonspor. By finishing 1st last year the club qualified for the 2003–04 UEFA Champions League. They, along with Galatasaray represented Turkey in the competition. They finished third, thereby proceeded the UEFA Cup where they lost in the Second Round to FC Valencia 5-2 on aggregate.

Süper Lig

Standings

Beşiktaş J.K. seasons
Besiktas